Amanda Leigh Moore (born April 10, 1984) is an American singer, songwriter, and actress. She rose to fame with her debut single, "Candy", which peaked at number 41 on the Billboard Hot 100. Her debut studio album, So Real (1999), received a platinum certification from the RIAA. The title single from her reissue of So Real, "I Wanna Be With You" (2000), became Moore's first top 40 song in the US, peaking at number 24 on the Hot 100. Moore subsequently released the studio albums Mandy Moore (2001), Coverage (2003), Wild Hope (2007), Amanda Leigh (2009), Silver Landings (2020), and In Real Life (2022). As of 2009, Moore has sold over 2.7 million albums in the US according to Billboard.

Moore made her feature film debut in 2001, with a minor voice role in Dr. Dolittle 2, before playing a supporting role in the comedy The Princess Diaries. She received recognition for her starring role in the romantic drama A Walk to Remember (2002). Her subsequent film credits include Chasing Liberty (2004), Saved! (2004), Racing Stripes (2005), Because I Said So (2007), License to Wed (2007), Love, Wedding, Marriage (2011), 47 Meters Down (2017), The Darkest Minds (2018), and Midway (2019). Moore also voiced Princess Rapunzel in the Disney animated fantasy musical film Tangled (2010).

From 2016 to 2022, Moore starred as Rebecca Pearson in the NBC family drama series This Is Us, receiving nominations for a Golden Globe Award and a Primetime Emmy Award. In 2019, Moore was awarded a star on the Hollywood Walk of Fame.

Early life
Moore was born on April 10, 1984, in Nashua, New Hampshire, to Stacy (née Friedman), a former news reporter who once worked for the Orlando Sentinel, and Donald Moore, a pilot for American Airlines. Moore was raised Catholic, but stopped practicing by 2004 and has since developed a "hotchpotch of things" that she believes. Moore is of Russian Jewish (from her maternal grandfather), English, Scottish and Irish descent. She has an older brother, Scott, and a younger brother, Kyle. When Moore was two months old, she and her family moved to Longwood, Florida, outside of Orlando, because of her father's job. From 1998 to 1999, Moore went to the Bishop Moore Catholic High School in Orlando.

Career

1993–1999: Career beginnings
Moore became interested in singing and acting at a young age, and called her British maternal grandmother, Eileen Friedman, a professional ballerina in London, one of her inspirations. Moore said "My parents thought it was just a phase I'd grow out of. But I stuck to it and begged them for acting lessons, for voice lessons."

Moore began acting in lead roles in a number of local productions and performing the national anthem at a number of events in Orlando. She was only twelve years old when she went to the Stagedoor Manor performing arts camp, where other celebrities including actress Natalie Portman had attended. Production director Konnie Kittrell said about Moore "She was a quiet, sweet girl", and said that she earned a number of solos, but "She wasn't a spotlight seeker."

When Moore was thirteen she began working on music by herself. One day while working in an Orlando studio, she was overheard by Victor Cade, a FedEx delivery man who had a friend in A&R at Epic Records. Cade later sent this friend a copy of Moore's unfinished demo, and Moore signed on with the label.

1999–2000: So Real, MTV, and I Wanna Be with You
After signing with Epic Records, Moore began working on her debut album. While recording the album, Moore had to leave Bishop Moore Catholic High School when she was only in the ninth-grade, but continued receiving her education from tutors. In the summer of 1999, Moore began touring with the boy band NSYNC. Later that year, Moore also toured with the boy band Backstreet Boys.

Moore's debut single, "Candy", was released on August 17, 1999, in the U.S. The single was a commercial success in a number of countries, but was immediately compared to the singles of fellow teen pop singers Jessica Simpson, Christina Aguilera, and Britney Spears. It debuted at number 88 on the Billboard Hot 100, before peaking at number 41 on the chart. The single later received a Gold certification from the RIAA, for sales exceeding 500,000 copies in the U.S. The single was the most successful in Australia, where it peaked at number 2 on the ARIA Charts and received a Platinum certification. Moore began to host and VJ at MTV, contributing to numerous shows including Total Request Live, Say What? Karaoke, and her own talk show which was originally called The Mandy Moore Show before being retitled as Mandy.

Moore's debut studio album, So Real, was released on December 7, 1999, by 550 Music through Epic Records. The album received a limited release in only a few countries. It received generally mixed reviews from critics when it was released, and Moore continued to be compared to other teen pop singers. Allmusic said about the album, "Fifteen-year-old Mandy Moore's debut album sounded like it was inspired almost entirely by listening to recent hit albums by 'N Sync, the Backstreet Boys, and Britney Spears." Entertainment Weekly had a similar opinion about the album, and gave it a C− in their review.

The album debuted at number 77 on the Billboard 200 chart. The album eventually continued to climb the chart until it peaked at number 31. It later received a Platinum certification from the RIAA, for sales exceeding one million copies in the U.S. alone. The album's second single, "Walk Me Home", was released on the same day as the album. The single did not have the same success of its predecessor, failing to appear on any major charts.

Before promotion for So Real had ended, Moore had already begun working on more music. The single "I Wanna Be with You", was released on July 11, 2000. "I Wanna Be with You" spent 16 weeks on the chart and reached its peak of 24 during its ninth week on the chart. The song became her first Top 20 hit on the Billboard Pop Songs chart, where it peaked at number 11. The single also became Moore's second Top 20 hit in Australia, where it peaked at number 13. It was also a minor success on the German Media Control Charts, where it peaked at number 70. The single received mixed to positive reviews. Billboard praised the song and said, "Top 40 programmers and listeners alike will love Moore more with this track", and Allmusic called the song a highlight track from the album.

A reissue of So Real, titled I Wanna Be with You, was released on May 9, 2000. Marketed as "a new version of Mandy's debut", the album was a compilation of new songs, remixes, and songs from Moore's debut album So Real. Internationally, where the So Real album was not released, I Wanna Be with You served as Moore's debut album, with multiple alternative track listings. The album received generally mixed reviews and was criticized for not being a true follow-up. Allmusic called the album  "trashier, flashier, gaudier, and altogether more disposable" than its predecessor So Real. The album was a commercial success, debuting and peaking at number 21 on the U.S. Billboard 200 chart. It later received a Gold certification from the RIAA, for sales exceeding 500,000 copies in the U.S. alone. Moore won the Kids' Choice Awards for Favorite Rising Star for the album in 2000. "Walk Me Home" was re-released in the United States as the second single from I Wanna Be with You and was slightly more successful than its original release, peaking at number 38 on the Billboard Pop Songs chart. The final single from the album, "So Real" was released exclusively in selected territories on June 13, 2000. In Australia, the single became her second Top 40 hit, peaking at number 21 on the ARIA Charts. The single also peaked at number 18 on the Official New Zealand Music Chart.

2001–2002: Mandy Moore and early acting roles
In 2001, Moore began working on her second studio album, which was said to move away from the "bubblegum pop" sound and image she became known for. Moore said during an interview with Billboard magazine that "All of the music has started to look and sound the same" and that she chose to move in a different musical direction. Moore also said that she wanted to feature more live instruments when performing, saying she wanted "no more dancers, no more singing to tracks. I got tired of that in a big way".

The album's lead single, "In My Pocket", was released on May 29, 2001. Entertainment Weekly said the single had "pumping, Indian-influenced Eurodisco". It failed to chart on the Billboard Hot 100 in the U.S., but peaked at number 2 on the Billboard Bubbling Under Hot 100 Singles chart, and it reached number 21 on the Billboard Pop Songs chart. The song became her third Top 20 hit in Australia, where it peaked at number 11 on the ARIA Charts.

Moore's self-titled second studio album, Mandy Moore, was released on June 19, 2001. The album had uptempo dance and pop songs and influences from Middle Eastern music. The album received mixed to average reviews from critics. Allmusic called the album a "lush, layered production".  The album debuted and peaked at number 35 on the Billboard 200 chart, and later received a Gold certification from the RIAA. The album has sold an estimated 1.5 million copies worldwide. The album also reached number 37 on the ARIA charts in Australia, her highest peak in the country to date. The album's second single, "Crush", was released on August 28, 2001; it peaked at number 35 on the Billboard Pop Songs chart, and it climbed to number 25 on the ARIA Charts.

Moore made her feature film debut in 2001, where she voiced a Girl Bear Cub in the comedy Dr. Dolittle 2, which starred Eddie Murphy. Later that year, Moore co-starred with Anne Hathaway in the comedy The Princess Diaries, based on Meg Cabot's novel of the same name, and was released on August 3, 2001. She played Lana Thomas, the rival of Mia Thermopolis (Hathaway). On her role, Moore told InStyle Magazine, "I'm the crude popular girl who gets ice cream in her face." The film opened in 2,537 theaters in North America and grossed $22,862,269 in its opening weekend. It grossed $165,335,153 worldwide—$108,248,956 in North America and $57,086,197 in other territories. The film received mixed to positive reviews. Rotten Tomatoes reported that 47% of 113 sampled critics gave the film positive reviews and that it got a rating average of 5.2 out of 10. In the film, Moore performed a cover of Connie Francis's 1958 song "Stupid Cupid" while at a beach party.

In 2002, Moore made her starring debut with Shane West and Peter Coyote in the romantic drama A Walk to Remember, based on Nicholas Sparks's novel of the same name. She played Jamie Sullivan, the unpopular daughter of Reverend Sullivan (Coyote). The film opened at #3 at the U.S. box office raking in $12,177,488 in its opening weekend, behind Snow Dogs and Black Hawk Down. The film received generally negative reviews, but Roger Ebert of the Chicago Sun-Times praised Moore and West's "quietly convincing" performances. It was a modest box office hit, earning $41,281,092 in the U.S. alone, and was a sleeper hit in Asia. The total revenue generated worldwide was $47,494,916. Moore received a number of nominations and awards for her performance in the film.

Moore's self-titled album's third and final single, "Cry", was released on November 4, 2001, to help promote the film. Commenting on the film, she said: "It was my first movie and I know people say it may be cliché and it's a tearjerker or it's cheesy, but for me, it's the thing I'm most proud of."

2003–2006: Coverage and continued acting
In 2003, Moore began working on her third studio album, later revealed to be a cover album called Coverage. The album had covers of 1970s and 1980s songs and was produced by John Fields. Moore's cover of John Hiatt's 1987 song "Have a Little Faith in Me" was released as the album's lead single shortly before the album, but it failed to enter any charts. The album was released on October 21, 2003, and received generally mixed reviews. Allmusic called the album a "leap to musical maturity," but Entertainment Weekly called it an "effort to shed her bubblegum-blond image."

The album debuted at number 14 on the Billboard 200 chart, with first week sales of 53,000. This made it Moore's highest debut on the chart, and highest-peaking album to date, but it is her lowest-selling, and her first album not to be certified by the RIAA. Moore's cover of XTC's 1982 song "Senses Working Overtime" was released as the album's second single and also failed to have any chart success. Moore's cover of Carole King's 1971 song "I Feel the Earth Move" was also on the compilation album Love Rocks from LGBT rights supporters. In 2004, Moore left Epic after five years of service because of creative differences. Moore and the label released her greatest hits album, The Best of Mandy Moore that had no new songs, on November 16, 2004, to end her contract. The album reached number 148 on the Billboard 200. Moore's third compilation album, Candy, was released on April 5, 2005.

In 2003, Moore co-starred with Allison Janney, Peter Gallagher, and Trent Ford in the romantic comedy-drama How to Deal which was based on Sarah Dessen's novels That Summer and Someone like You. She played Halley Martin, a cynical and rebellious seventeen-year-old who deals with falling in love with Macon Forrester (Ford), the new boy at her school and her relationships and issues with her family and friends. The film failed to find teenage audiences in the U.S. and grossed a total of $14 million domestically.

In 2004, Moore co-starred with Matthew Goode in the romantic comedy Chasing Liberty. She played Anna Foster, the rebellious eighteen-year-old "First Daughter" who wants more freedom from the Secret Service. The film grossed approximately $12 million. Both How to Deal and Chasing Liberty received generally negative and lukewarm reviews, respectively; but Ebert singled Moore's performances out again and said in his review of How to Deal that Moore has "an unaffected natural charm" and "almost makes the movie worth seeing," and said in his review of Chasing Liberty that she has "undeniable screen presence and inspires instant affection." Other critics called Moore an "actress of limited range," but one review of Chasing Liberty called her the "most painless of former pop princesses." (Another romantic comedy with a similar theme, First Daughter, which starred Katie Holmes, was released later that year.)

Late in 2004, Moore co-starred with Jena Malone, Macaulay Culkin and Patrick Fugit in the religion satirical comedy-drama Saved!. She played Hilary Faye Stockard, a proper and popular girl at a Christian high school. The film received generally positive reviews, but it did not receive a wide release. Moore's performance was praised, with one critic calling her a "demented delight" and another calling it her best performance to date. She and Michael Stipe covered The Beach Boys' 1966 song "God Only Knows", which bookended the film.

In 2005, Moore co-starred in the sports family comedy-drama Racing Stripes, where she voiced Sandy the white horse, and guest-starred in the HBO comedy-drama Entourage. Moore was also originally scheduled to star in the films Cursed, Havoc and The Upside of Anger, which were all eventually released in 2005, but without her involvement in any of them.

In 2006, Moore guest-starred as Julie Quinn in two episodes of the fifth season of the NBC medical sitcom Scrubs, that were the ninth episode "My Half-Acre" and the tenth episode "Her Story II". The same year, she guest-starred in the Fox animated sitcom The Simpsons, where she voiced Tabitha Vixx in the seventeenth-season finale called "Marge and Homer Turn a Couple Play".

Moore also co-starred with Hugh Grant, Dennis Quaid and William Dafoe in Paul Weitz's satirical comedy American Dreamz, which was released in April 2006. She played Sally Kendoo, a sociopathic contestant on a singing competition series modelled after American Idol. Weitz said that he had Moore in mind for the role before she was cast, explaining that "there's something inherently sweet about Mandy; it makes it all the more interesting to see her in a villainess role." Moore has said that she enjoys playing mean-spirited characters, but fears being typecast as a villain. The film opened at number nine at the U.S. box office, eventually totaling barely $7 million, and it received generally mixed reviews. Owen Gleiberman of Entertainment Weekly praised Moore's and Grant's "wicked barbed chemistry" in their roles, but Robert Koehler of Variety called Moore's role a "pitch-perfect study of a woman for whom a reality show is reality."

Later in 2006, Moore voiced Nita, the heroine of the Disney animated sequel Brother Bear 2, which was released directly to DVD on August 29, 2006. ComingSoon.net praised Moore's "surprisingly good performance". That same year, Moore was originally cast in Emilio Estevez's drama Bobby, but was replaced by Mary Elizabeth Winstead.

2007–2009: Wild Hope and Amanda Leigh
In 2006, Moore talked about her early albums, saying she believed her debut album So Real was appropriate for her age at the time when she released it, but she felt it "sucked" and that her first two albums were "just awful". Moore also said that she "would give a refund to everyone who bought [her] first two albums" if she could. During a radio interview in April 2006, the show's co-host—who had seen Moore's comments—asked her for a refund on her debut album, which she fulfilled.

In early 2006, Moore said that she missed her music career and that singing is what she was the "most passionate about". In 2004, Moore signed with Sire Records after her contract with Epic ended, but she left the label in May 2006 because of creative differences. She signed with The Firm Music, owned by EMI, in July that year, calling her recording contract "especially exciting", and saying that she left Sire because she did not want to "follow the mainstream", but rather have "complete control and freedom" over her music.

Moore, citing her conservative upbringing, expressed displeasure with her appearance on a May 2006 cover of Cosmopolitan where the headline was "orgasms unlimited", which referred to an article unrelated to her. Afterward, Moore co-starred with Diane Keaton, Gabriel Macht and Tom Everett Scott in the romantic comedy Because I Said So. In the film, Milly Wilder (Moore) describes in detail the feeling of an orgasm to her mother Daphne (Keaton). The film was released on February 2, 2007, and received mixed to negative reviews, but was a financial success, earning over $69 million worldwide at the box office. Later that year, Moore co-starred with John Krasinski and Robin Williams in the romantic comedy License to Wed which was released on July 3, 2007. The film received overwhelmingly negative reviews. Rotten Tomatoes gave the film a 7% rating and a critical consensus of "broad and formulaic". Metacritic.com rated it 25 out of 100, citing 21 generally negative reviews out of 30 for its rating.

Variety called the film "an astonishingly flat romantic comedy, filled with perplexing choices", but Variety called Moore's performance "appealing". The film grossed $10,422,258 in its opening weekend opening at #4 at the U.S. Box Office behind Live Free or Die Hard, Ratatouille and Transformers, which opened at the top spot. The film had grossed $43.8 million domestically and $69.3 million worldwide. On September 24, 2007, Moore guest-starred in the CBS sitcom How I Met Your Mother in the third-season premiere called "Wait for It". Later that year, she co-starred with Billy Crudup, Tom Wilkinson and Dianne Wiest in the romantic comedy Dedication. She played Lucy Reilly, a struggling children's book illustrator who falls in love with Henry Roth (Crudup). The film premiered at the 2007 Sundance Film Festival and received mixed to positive reviews from critics. The review aggregator Rotten Tomatoes reported that the film received 41% positive reviews, based on 46 reviews. Metacritic reported the film had an average score of 50 out of 100, based on 19 reviews.

Moore's fourth studio album Wild Hope was released on June 19, 2007, and Moore collaborated with record producer John Alagía and a number of musicians on it, including Chantal Kreviazuk, Lori McKenna, Rachael Yamagata and The Weepies. Moore stayed alone in a house in Woodstock in Upstate New York while recording the album in late 2006. Moore performed the album's lead single "Extraordinary" at the Brick Awards on April 12, 2007, and launched a tour in the summer of 2007.

The album received mixed to positive reviews from critics. Billboard said that "Wild Hope is the gratifying sound of a singer finally finding her comfort zone. Gone is the sugary pop of Moore's early career, replaced instead by thoughtful musings on love and life…an album full of subtle, but undeniable hooks." The album debuted on the U.S. Billboard 200 at #30, selling a mere 25,000 copies the first week of its release, according to Billboard. It is Moore's third-highest-debuting album, falling short of her fourth studio album Coverage (2003), which debuted at No. 14 on the Billboard 200 chart, selling 59,000 copies. The album also reached No. 9 on The Top Internet albums. After five weeks, the album charted off the Billboard 200, but it returned to the chart at No. 118 after selling 5,500 copies. To date, the album has sold over 120,000 copies in the U.S. and more than 350,000 copies worldwide. On February 23, 2008, Moore released the album in Australia, and subsequently toured with musician Ben Lee and the West Australian Symphony Orchestra in Western Australia, supporting inaugural American Idol winner Kelly Clarkson on her tour.

Moore began working on her fifth studio album in 2008 that was scheduled to be released the following year. In October 2008, Moore posted on her website blog live videos of three songs that she had been working on with singer-songwriter, record producer, pianist and guitarist Mike Viola. It was rumored to be a duo album between Moore and Viola, but then in January 2009, it was revealed it would be Moore's fifth studio album with a collaboration with Viola, that was scheduled to be released in April 2009. Recording sessions for the album took place around December 2008 in Boston, Massachusetts. The album's lead single "I Could Break Your Heart Any Day of the Week" was released on March 17, 2009, as a digital download. The music video premiered on April 20, 2009, on Yahoo! Music. The single, like most of Moore's previous singles, failed to have much success on any charts. Moore's fifth studio album, Amanda Leigh, was released on May 26, 2009. On the album, Moore said, "The music is all a reflection of me now, not somebody else's choices." Moore visited a number of talk shows including The Ellen DeGeneres Show and The Tonight Show with Jay Leno.

On both shows, she performed "I Could Break Your Heart Any Day of the Week" to promote the album. On May 26, 2009, she performed songs from the album at Amoeba Music in Hollywood, together with Viola, the day the album was released by Storefront Records. The album was not released in some territories until 2010 and was not released in Brazil until 2011, two years after its initial release. The album received generally positive reviews. Time magazine called the album "impeccably recorded". An article on the album by Paper magazine said, "Mandy (in the album)... shows real thoughtful and emotional depth." Paper finished by saying that "Moore is a far better musician than she's often given credit for." It debuted at number 25 on the Billboard 200, selling 16,000 copies in the U.S. during the week of its release, and at number 4 on the Top Independent albums chart. To date, the album has sold an estimated 100,000 copies.  The album was recorded just before Moore's marriage to musician Ryan Adams and it was her final album for over ten years.

2010–2015: Tangled and further acting 
After a break of almost two years from film roles, Moore co-starred with Martin Freeman in the romantic comedy Swinging with the Finkels. The film was shot in the United Kingdom in 2009 and was released in 2011. Moore co-starred with Kellan Lutz in the romantic comedy Love, Wedding, Marriage. The film was shot in 2010 and released in 2011. In 2010, Moore made a guest-starring appearance as Mary Portman in the ABC medical drama Grey's Anatomy, for the two-part sixth-season finale, her first television role since 2007. She returned to the show for two episodes of the seventh season.

Also that year, Moore co-starred with Zachary Levi where she voiced Rapunzel in the CGI Disney animated fantasy musical comedy Tangled. The film received generally positive reviews from critics. Rotten Tomatoes reported that 89% of critics have given the film a positive review based on 185 reviews, with an average score of 7.5/10. The site's consensus read: "While far from Disney's greatest film, Tangled is a visually stunning, thoroughly entertaining addition to the studio's classic animated canon." Another review aggregator Metacritic, which assigned a weighted average score from 0–100 out of reviews from mainstream film critics, calculated a score of 71 based on 34 reviews. CinemaScore polled conducted during the opening weekend revealed the average grade cinemagoers gave the film was an "A+" on an A+ to F scale. It earned $200,821,936 in North America, and $389,900,000 in other countries, for a worldwide total of $590,721,936. 

Worldwide, it is the 17th-highest-grossing animated film, the eighth-highest-grossing film of 2010, and the third-highest-grossing 2010 animated film, behind Toy Story 3 and Shrek Forever After. It is also the third Disney film appearing in the Top 10 films of 2010. It was the third-highest-grossing film worldwide produced by Walt Disney Animation Studios, behind Frozen (2013) and The Lion King (1994), as of 2011. Moore and Levi performed the film's theme song, "I See the Light", at the 83rd Academy Awards, where it was nominated for Best Original Song. The song also won a Grammy Award for Best Song Written For Visual Media as well as Best Song at the Las Vegas Film Critics Society. In October 2011, it was announced that she was set to star in an ABC sitcom called Us and Them, but the pilot was eventually passed by the network. In 2012, she co-starred with Carla Gugino and Rufus Sewell in Sebastian Gutierrez's crime drama Hotel Noir, which was released on October 9, 2012, in the U.S. From 2012 to 2013, Moore voiced Mara in the short-lived Disney XD animated science fiction series Tron: Uprising. She voiced the title character in the Disney Junior animated series Sheriff Callie's Wild West from 2014 to 2015.

In July 2012, Moore announced that she would be collaborating with her then-husband, musician Ryan Adams, on her upcoming sixth studio album. She said, "There's tremendous influence right now around the house... from the music I've been introduced to and being very happy and in a healthy, happy relationship… I think that still garners a lot of material to write about." She later said, "There's a lot to say and a lot that's happened to me in the last three or so years since the last record's come out, so I have been writing a lot and it's definitely going to be an intense, emotional record. I'm excited about it. I'm excited to get into the studio and start recording." She also said that she thought the album would be "intense, emotional". On February 20, 2013, it was announced Moore would be starring as Louise in the ABC sitcom Pulling, based on the British sitcom of the same name. The pilot was written by Lee Eisenberg and Gene Stupnitsky, but in March, as the pilot came closer to production, Moore's character was moved in a different direction and she considered herself to be no longer right for the role. Moore asked to leave the pilot and ABC agreed to it. In a July 2014 interview with CBS News, Moore said that 2014 was "the year of actual progress forward" on her sixth album and said it was more "dangerous" and "raw" than her previous albums, and said that she hoped to start recording the album in Adams's studio later in the summer; she also revealed that she would appear on Adams's self-titled fourteenth album, Ryan Adams, which was released on September 5, 2014. From 2014 to 2015, Moore had a recurring role as Dr. Erin Grace in the short-lived Fox medical comedy-drama Red Band Society.

In June 2015, it was confirmed that Moore and Levi would reprise their roles as Rapunzel and Eugene "Flynn Rider" Fitzherbert in an animated television series based on Tangled. The series, Tangled: The Series, set between Tangled and Tangled Ever After, premiered on the Disney Channel in 2017. Moore co-starred with Claire Holt in the underwater survival thriller 47 Meters Down. Filming began at Pinewood Studios in the United Kingdom and Dominican Republic on June 18, 2015, and finished on August 7, 2015. The film was released on June 16, 2017.

In September 2015, Moore said that she was continuing to work on her sixth album. "I've been working on music steadily for the last couple of years," she explained. "I guess 2016 will be the re-emergence of my music. That side of my life has been dormant for too long in my opinion."

2016–present: This Is Us, awards recognition and Silver Landings
Moore has been co-starring as Rebecca Pearson at ages ranging from mid-20s to late 60s and later 80 in the NBC family comedy-drama This Is Us since September 2016, where she received a Golden Globe Award nomination for her role. In July 2017, Moore announced her intentions to return to music in an interview with People. She said, "I want to return to music" and that "I don't have a record label, but I have a lot of music written. Next year, I've decided I'm putting it out there!" In July 2018, she also said on Jimmy Kimmel Live! that she might collaborate with her now husband, musician Taylor Goldsmith, Dawes' lead singer and guitarist, on her new music. In August 2018, Moore co-starred with Amandla Stenberg and Patrick Gibson in the dystopian science-fiction thriller The Darkest Minds. In November, she reprised her role as Rapunzel in the Disney CGI animated comedy Ralph Breaks the Internet with John C. Reilly, Sarah Silverman, Gal Gadot, Taraji P. Henson, Kristen Bell and Jane Lynch. The film grossed almost $500 million worldwide and received generally positive reviews from critics, who called it a "worthy successor" and praised the animation, humor, characters, plot and the vocal performances of Reilly and Silverman. The film received a Best Animated Feature nomination at the 76th Golden Globe Awards and 24th Critics' Choice Awards.

In February 2019, Moore co-starred with Justin Bartha, Barbara Jacques and Paul Lieberstein in the short comedic action film The Big Break. In March, she co-starred with J.K. Simmons, Sebastian Stan, Max Greenfield and Maika Monroe in the drama I'm Not Here and voiced Courtney in the Fox animated sitcom Family Guy, in the season 17 episode "No Giggity, No Doubt". On March 25, 2019, Moore received her star on the Hollywood Walk of Fame. After teasing fans with snippets of new music and photos from the studio throughout the year, on September 17, 2019, Moore released her first original song in over a decade, the single "When I Wasn't Watching", with an accompanying music video; this was followed by the single "I'd Rather Lose" on October 31. In November, she co-starred in the independent historical drama Midway with Ed Skrein, Patrick Wilson, Luke Evans, Aaron Eckhart, Nick Jonas, Dennis Quaid, and Woody Harrelson.

In January 2020, Moore said in an interview with Billboard that her sixth studio album was titled Silver Landings and would be released in early March, via Verve Forecast Records. She said regarding her decision to sign with Verve Forecast in late 2019, "I had slight PTSD from being on labels in the past [...] but Verve truly feels like it's run by a bunch of deeply creative people who aren't necessarily just concerned with the numbers game". Moore later announced a release date of March 6, and also released the single "Save a Little for Yourself" with an accompanying music video.

In early 2022, Moore released two singles from her seventh studio album, In Real Life. On March 8, she released the audio for the album's title track, and, on the 17th, a cameo-laden video with many of her This Is Us co-stars and Matthew Koma, Hilary Duff, Wilmer Valderrama, Amanda Kloots, Karamo Brown, and others. On April 5, Moore debuted the audio from her second single off the album, "Little Dreams". The album was released on May 13, 2022.

Moore announced in 2022 that she would be taking a hiatus from acting.

Musical style and influences

When Moore's musical career began in 1999, she was known for her bubblegum pop sound and image, which she revealed was not the type of music she prefers, saying, "[The record company] was like, 'Here are your songs.' I was like, 'Hi, I'm fourteen. I'll do anything.' Those albums are why I'm here today, but god damn, I should give a refund to anyone who bought my first record".

Moore has often been praised by music critics for branching off and writing her own music. Billboard said, "She has successfully dropped all the tacky accoutrements of her past and turned into a sweet, classy singer-songwriter whose charms are readily apparent". AllMusic said, "Moore smoothly evolved from adolescent starlet to mature songwriter, continuing to distance herself from the scene that had launched her career one decade prior".

Moore has said that she was inspired by film and television as a child. She has also said, "I'm stuck in the '70s. I think I'll always have that kind of influence. Joni Mitchell, Todd Rundgren, Harry Nilsson, McCartney—that's the sort of stuff I'm really inspired and influenced by". Moore also said how her then-husband, musician Ryan Adams, had a huge influence on her music, and that he introduced her to heavy metal. "Not that I can necessarily differentiate between speed metal and black metal…" she said. "I'll tolerate it, but I turn it down". Moore has said that she has become more comfortable with her older music, and she even found new ways to present her more bubblegum-friendly songs with a more contemporary musical arrangement.

Other endeavors

Fashion

Moore's fashion career began in 2005 with her own fashion line called Mblem. That was a brand of contemporary knitwear and cashmere. In February 2009, Moore announced that the line would be discontinued, but that she hoped to return to her fashion career under different circumstances in the future.

Philanthropy
Moore advocates "giving with your head", endorsing the philosophy of effective altruism. Moore has worked with and highlighted nonprofit organization Population Services International (PSI), and its subsidiary, Five & Alive, which addresses health crises facing children under the age of five and their families. Moore has served as the Honorary Chairperson of the Leukemia and Lymphoma Society's division on awareness for youth. She served as a spokesperson by helping young people be aware of the seriousness of leukemia and lymphoma. She also serves as the spokesperson for Cervical Cancer Awareness Month, held every January. In addition, to increase cervical cancer awareness, Moore collaborated with Dr. Yvonne Collins, The Gynecologic Cancer Foundation (GCF), and GlaxoSmithKline (GSK). Moore made a surprise visit at Children's Hospital Los Angeles as a part of Get Well Soon Tour. Moore is the ambassador for the UN Foundations's Nothing But Nets malaria prevention campaign. As a part of the Nothing But Nets campaign Moore interviewed Laurence D. Wohlers, United States Ambassador to the Central African Republic, in 2010 and helped the campaign raise $1.2 million. Moore is also the spokesperson for Dove's self-esteem movement and the "Women who should be famous" campaign. Moore also teamed up with Indrani Goradia, a domestic violence survivor and founder of Indrani's Light Foundation, along with Mom Bloggers Club, to help raise awareness and campaign against domestic violence.

Politics
In July 2016, Moore appeared on an a cappella version of Rachel Platten's song "Fight Song" along with several other celebrities for the 2016 Democratic National Convention for Hillary Clinton's unsuccessful second bid at the presidency.

Moore was one of the demonstrators at the Los Angeles 2017 Women's March held on January 21, 2017.

On January 13, 2020, Moore officially endorsed Pete Buttigieg for President of the United States prior to the Iowa caucuses. Moore also uses her social media platforms to support criminal justice reform and Black Lives Matter.

Personal life
Moore dated former Scrubs star Zach Braff from 2004 to 2006. In 2008, Moore began dating former Whiskeytown frontman Ryan Adams. They became engaged in February 2009 and married on March 10, 2009, in Savannah, Georgia. In January 2015, Moore filed for divorce from Adams while he was in New York, citing "irreconcilable differences". Moore and Adams later released a joint statement explaining their decision, calling it a "respectful, amicable parting of ways", but in 2019 she called him emotionally abusive. Court documents obtained later revealed that they had been legally separated for nearly six months before the filing. The divorce was finalized in June 2016.

In 2015, Moore began dating Dawes frontman Taylor Goldsmith. They were engaged in September 2017 and married on November 18, 2018, in Los Angeles, California. In February 2021, Moore gave birth to the couple's first child, a boy.

In 2018, Moore appeared on the eleventh season of Who Do You Think You Are?, during which historian Turtle Bunbury revealed how her great-great-great-great-grandmother Mary Flynn had died at the age of 40 in an Irish workhouse.

In 2019, Moore, accompanied by friends and fellow hikers reached the Everest base camp which has an elevation of 17,598 ft.

In June 2022, Moore announced that she was expecting her second son with Goldsmith. On October 21, 2022, Moore announced that her second son was born.

In August 2022, Moore was  diagnosed with immune thrombocytopenic purpura, an autoimmune disease that causes abnormally low levels of platelets.

Discography

Studio albums
 So Real (1999)
 Mandy Moore (2001)
 Coverage (2003)
 Wild Hope (2007)
 Amanda Leigh (2009)
 Silver Landings (2020)
 In Real Life (2022)

Tours

Headlining
In Real Life Tour (2022)

Co-headlining
 Paula Cole and Mandy Moore in Concert (2007)

Opening act
NSYNC in Concert (1999)
Into the Millennium Tour (1999)

Filmography

Film

Television

Music video

Video games

Awards and honors

In 2012, Moore was ranked number 96 on VH1's list of "100 Greatest Women in Music" as well as number 63 on their "Sexiest Artists of All Time List".

She was nominated for a Golden Globe Award for Best Supporting Actress – Series, Miniseries or Television Film and a Primetime Emmy Award for Outstanding Lead Actress in a Drama Series. As a part of the ensemble cast of This Is Us, she received two Screen Actors Guild Awards for Outstanding Performance by an Ensemble in a Drama Series.

On March 25, 2019, she received a star on the Hollywood Walk of Fame.

References

External links

 
 
 
 

 
1984 births
Living people
20th-century American women singers
20th-century American singers
21st-century American actresses
21st-century American women singers
21st-century American singers
550 Music artists
Actresses from New Hampshire
Actresses from Orlando, Florida
American child actresses
American child singers
American women pop singers
American women singer-songwriters
American film actresses
American folk-pop singers
American people of British descent
American people of English descent
American people of Irish descent
American people of Russian-Jewish descent
American people of Scottish descent
American television actresses
American video game actresses
American voice actresses
Child pop musicians
Jewish American actresses
Jewish American musicians
Jewish American songwriters
Jewish women singers
Bishop Moore High School alumni
Lake Brantley High School alumni
People from Nashua, New Hampshire
Singers from New Hampshire
Singers from Orlando, Florida
Songwriters from New Hampshire
Singer-songwriters from Florida
United Service Organizations entertainers